Newgiza University (NGU) is a private university in Giza, Egypt, founded in 2016. It has a partnership with University College London and King's College London.

Faculties 
 Faculty of Medicine: accepting 200 students per year
 Faculty of Dentistry: accepting 150 students per year
 Faculty of Pharmacy: accepting 150 students per year
 Faculty of Business and Finance: accepting 400 students per year
 Faculty of Economics and Politics: accepting 50 students per year
 Faculty of Information Technology
Faculty of Engineering recently opened in the fall of 2021.
Faculty of Fine Arts recently opening in the fall of 2022.

Board of Trustees 
 The board of trustees is headed by Farouk El Okdah, Former Governor of the Central Bank of Egypt.
Ahmed Sameh Farid, Newgiza University President.
Zahi Hawass, Former Minister of Archeology.
Lamis Ragab, Newgiza University Vice President.
Magdy Ishak, President of the Egyptian Medical Society, UK.
Samiha Fawzi, Former Minister of Trade and Industry.
Ahmed Darwish, Former Minister of State for Administration Development.
Ahmed Aboul Gheit, Secretary-General of the Arab League and Former Minister of Foreign Affairs.
 Sir Derek Plumbly, Former British Ambassador to Egypt and KSA, Professor at King's College London.
Mohamed Shawky, Head of Dentistry Department, Misr International Hospital.
Sami Omar Ali El-Sady, Professor of Civil Engineering at Trablus University.

References

External links
Official website

Universities in Egypt